Drug-resistant epilepsy (DRE), also known as refractory epilepsy or pharmacoresistant epilepsy, is diagnosed when there failure of adequate trials of two tolerated and appropriately chosen and used antiepileptic drugs (AEDs) (whether as monotherapies or in combination) to achieve sustained seizure freedom. The probability that the next medication will achieve seizure freedom drops with every failed AED. For example, after two failed AEDs, the probability that the third will achieve seizure freedom is around 4%. Drug-resistant epilepsy is commonly diagnosed after several years of uncontrolled seizures, however, in most cases, it is evident much earlier.  Approximately 30% of people with epilepsy have a drug-resistant form.

When 2 AED regimens have failed to produce sustained seizure-freedom, it is important to initiate other treatments to control seizures. Next to indirect consequences like injuries from falls, accidents, drowning and impairment in daily life, seizure control is critical because uncontrolled seizures -specifically generalized tonic clonic seizures- can damage the brain and increase the risk for sudden unexpected death in epilepsy called SUDEP. The first step is for physicians to refer their DRE patients to an epilepsy center.

Diagnostic evaluation

Prolonged EEG/Continuous video EEG/ Epilepsy Monitoring Unit monitoring 
One of the first steps in management of drug resistant epilepsy is confirming the diagnosis by EEG. Typically patients are admitted to hospital for prolonged EEG monitoring. Typically patients are taken off their antiseizure medications so that the evolution of seizure symptoms and there relation with changes in electrical activity of brain can be determined; while minimizing adverse consequences of seizures as far as possible. Additional maneuvers to provoke seizures are also frequently performed, like sleep deprivation, photic stimulation, hyperventilation. This study can take 3–14 days. Length of study depends of factors like baseline seizure frequency, number and type of seizure medication patient is taking prior to study, institutional protocols etc. The goal is to record 3-4 typical seizures, though in some cases more or less seizures may need to be recorded. After this evaluation some patients may be determined to have non-epileptic causes of their symptoms, eg syncope, psychogenic nonepileptic seizures, cardiac arrhythmia etc. For patients who are confirmed to have epilepsy, this testing helps confirm the type of epilpesy- generalized vs focal. In case of focal epilepsy, this evaluation provides crucial information to determine the area of brain where seizures begin. Information from seizure symptoms and their evolution over the course of the seizure as well changes on EEG in relation to the symptoms is used to hypothesize the likely area of the brain responsible for seizure symptoms (symptomatic zone) and by extrapolation the area where seizure likely starts (seizure onset zone).

In some specific cases, prolonged EEG may be done as an outpatient or ambulatory study where patient goes home with EEG set-up. This type of monitoring is usually limited to 2–3 days and patients are not taken off their medications.

Neuroimaging 
MRI of brain is the most common neuroimaging modality to be used in evaluation of epilepsy. A 3 Tesla MRI is generally recommended, as opposed to scanning on lower magnet strengths. MRI for evaluation of epilepsy often include T1 and T2 images with small voxel size, that are optimized to appreciate gray-white matter differentiation and oblique coronal images along the axis of hippocampus. Identification of lesions like focal cortical dysplasia, mesial temporal sclerosis, microencephalocele, heterotopia require thorough review of images by trained clinicians as the changes can be very subtle and easily missed if not specifically evaluated for. There is active research to develop newer ways of processing information from MRI to better identify subtle structural lesions that can be associated with seizures. There is also ongoing quantitative analysis of standard MRI images to identify subtle lesions and use of stronger magnetic fields, like 7Tesla MRI, for better delineation of anatomical details.

Positron emission tomography scan using [18F]DG is often used in evaluation of drug resistant epilepsy as well. Its use in epilepsy evaluation is based on the idea that areas of brain responsible for seizure onset also have persistent metabolic dysfunction. So they do not use glucose at the same rate as normal healthy brain. Areas involved in seizure onset or early propagation are expected to have lower glucose uptake, hence, lower radiotracer uptake, compared to other parts. Other ligands like 11C-flumazenil, 11C-alpha-methyl-L-tryptophan, 11C-methionine, have also been used, mostly on research basis to help identify areas of seizure onset. PET-MRI involves coregisteration of PET and MRI images to better identify areas of cortex with relative hypometabolism.

SPECT scan is another radiotracer based imaging technique that uses oxygen radio-isotope to assess blood flow. This imaging is performed during inpatient video EEG monitoring. The tracer is injected in patient's vein as soon as a seizure starts with the idea that areas of brain associated with seizure onset will have increase blood flow at seizure onset, hence, will show increase uptake of the tracer if injected at an appropriate time. Imaging is performed after seizure is over and patient is medically stable to be taken to the scanner. Post hoc analysis to assess areas showing significant increase in blood flow at seizure onset, compared to resting state, is used to identify areas of onset and early propagation. A major limitation with this technique is early identification of seizure onset for injection of radiotracer to be given well before the seizure discharge has spread widely.

Neuropsychological testing 

This includes a battery of tests to assess higher mental functions like memory, executive function, language functions, overall IQ etc. If there is poor performance in measures of specific cognitive domains like verbal memory, naming, visuo-spatial orientation; it may point to areas of brain that are dysfunctional and likely related to seizure onset. This testing could also indicate poor performance on most measures and suggest more widespread dysfunction in the brain. Besides helping assess the likely area of seizure onset, this testing also informs about cognitive risks from epilepsy surgery.

Language Lateralization 
If epilepsy surgery is being considered, often a test is performed to determine the hemisphere of brain that is dominant for language and memory function. This helps inform about potential risks to language and memory with surgery. There are two main tests available for this objective- Wada test and fMRI.

Wada test has been one of the most commonly used tests around the world since the 1960s. This is an invasive procedure that requires neurointerventionalists, neuropsychologists, neurophysiologists, EEG technologists, anesthetists among the team members. A catheter is threaded from wrist or groin into the carotid artery and then the middle cerebral artery. An injection of sodium amytal is then given to temporarily anesthetize 2/3rd of the cerebral hemisphere on one side. Neuropsychological testing is done to assess language and memory function of the other hemisphere. Once patient is fully recovered from the injection on first side, the catheter is withdrawn and threaded up the other middle cerebral artery for transient anesthesia in the other hemisphere and testing of the hemisphere injected first. This testing informs the "reserve" for memory and language function in each hemisphere and potential for decline in these with resective surgery on a given side. In some cases additional testing with selective injection of posterior cerebral artery (that supplies the mesial temporal region including hippoampus) can be done to assess potential change in function with loss of these mesial structures on either side.

Wada is increasingly being replaced by fMRI which is a noninvasive test. Functional MRI or fMRI measure the change in blood flow and oxygenation in different parts of the brain, in response to an activity. Different tasks or paradigms are presented to a patient while they are in an MRI scanner. These tasks are designed to make the patient think of words, meaning of words, read, listen to language stimuli etc and hence, activate areas involved in different language functions while continuous scanning is being done. Post processing of the images helps identify areas that are activated during different language tasks.

Other Tests 
MEG

Surgery 
In epilepsy surgery, a distinction can be made between resective and disconnective procedures. In a resective procedure the area of the brain that causes the seizures is removed. In a disconnective procedure the neural connections in the brain that allow the seizures to spread are disconnected. In most cases epilepsy surgery is only an option when the area of the brain that causes the seizures - the so-called epileptic focus can be clearly identified and is not responsible for critical functions such as language. Several imaging techniques such as magnetic resonance tomography and functional techniques like electrocorticography are used to demarcate the epileptic focus clearly.

Lobe resection

Temporal lobe epilepsy (TLE) in which the epileptic focus is in the temporal lobe, is one of the most common types of epilepsy in adolescents and adults. Hence temporal lobe resection, during which the whole temporal lobe or just a part of the temporal lobe for example the hippocampus or the amygdala is removed, is the most common epilepsy surgery procedure. Between 40 and 60% of patients that undergo temporal lobe resection are continuously seizure free The surgery itself is very safe with a mortality of 0%. The risk for neurologic complications from a temporal lobe resection is around 3 to 7%

Lesionectomy

If the source of seizures is a lesion, for example a scar tissue from a brain injury a tumor or malformed blood vessels, this lesion can be removed surgically in a lesionectomy.

Corpus callosotomy

Corpus callosotomy is a palliative procedure for specially severe cases of epilepsy. This corpus callosum is a large bundle of nerve fibers that connects both brain halves with each other. To prevent the spreading of seizures from one brain hemisphere (brain half) to the other the corpus callosum can be split. This procedure is mostly carried out on patients with so-called drop attacks that come with a very high risk of injury and in which the epileptic focus is not clearly delimitable. It is very rare that a corpus callosotomy causes seizure freedom however in half of the patients the dangerous drop attacks are less severe.  After a corpus callosotomy among others there is the risk that language is temporarily or permanently impaired. The younger a patient is at the time of the corpus callosotomy, the better the prognosis.

Functional hemispherectomy

This procedure is a modern adaptation of the radical hemispherectomy in which one brain hemisphere is removed to prevent the spread of seizures from one brain hemisphere to the other. In the functional version only a part of the hemisphere is removed but the connections to the other brain hemisphere are cut through. This procedure is only performed on a small group of patients under the age of 13 that have severe damage or malformation of one hemisphere, patients with Sturge Weber syndrome or patients with Rasmussen's encephalitis. The functional hemispherectomy can achieve long-term seizure freedom in over 80% of patients however often at the price of hemiplegia and hemianopsy. The death rate is around 1 to 2% and 5% of patients develop a hydrocephalus that needs to be treated with a shunt.

Multiple subpial transection

Multiple subpial transection (MST) is a palliative procedure that is considered when an epileptic focus can be identified but cannot be removed because it is in a functionally relevant brain region- a so-called eloquent region. In an MST nerve fibers are disconnected so that seizures cannot spread from the epileptic focus into the rest of the brain. Between 60 and 70% of patients experienced a seizure reduction of over 95% after an MST and the risk for neurologic deficits is around 19%.

Vagus nerve stimulation
Vagus nerve stimulation (VNS) involves implanting  a pacemaker-like generator below the skin in the chest area that intermittently sends electrical impulses to the left vagus nerve in the neck. The impulses are mediated to the brain by the vagus nerve and thereby help to inhibit electrical disturbances that cause seizures. The antiepileptic effect of vagus nerve stimulation increases over several months: after two years around half of VNS patients experience a reduction of their seizures by at least 50% and after 10 years the average seizure reduction is around 75% Furthermore, in most patients mood (VNS has a significant anti-depressent effect and is approved for depression in some countries), alertness and quality-of-life are increased significantly within the first year of vagus nerve stimulation. VNS patients can induce an extra stimulation themselves with a VNS magnet when they noticed that a seizure is approaching and it has been shown that the majority of seizures can be interrupted this type of on-demand stimulation.

The procedure to implant a vagus nerve stimulator is very safe: no case of death related to VNS implantation surgery has ever occurred. Infection of the tissue pocket in which the generator is located that requires antibiotic treatment occurs in around 3% of patients. The most common side effect is hoarseness or change in voice. Headaches and shortness of breath are less common. In most cases, side effects only occur during activity of the stimulation (mostly every 3 to 5 minutes) and reduce over time. In most cases VNS does not replace antiepileptic medication. Patients must continue their antiepileptic medication however in many cases the dose can be reduced over time so that patients experience fewer side effects of the medication. The battery of the VNS generator can depending on the model and the settings can last between 3 and 10 years.

VNS with cardiac-based seizure detection

In 82% of epilepsy patients the heart rate increases quickly and suddenly upon a seizure This is known as ictal tachycardia. Ictal tachycardia is so characteristic that it can be distinguished from the slow gradual increase of heart rate that occurs during physical activity. This way in the majority of epilepsy patients seizures can be detected in the ECG. In addition to classical VNS, some new VNS generators continuously monitor heart rate and identify fast and sudden heart rate increases associated with seizures with intelligent software. Then an automatic additional stimulation can be triggered to interrupt, prevent or alleviate the seizure. This new generator type was shown to detect and treat at least four out of five seizures and 60% of seizures were shown to be interrupted with this heart-rate triggered stimulation. The earlier in the course of the seizure the stimulation occurred the quicker the seizure ended generally seizures were shown to be reduced by around 35% by  stimulation

Diets
For over 100 years it has been known that a diet with a high fat content and a low carbohydrate content can reduce seizures. Radically curbing carbohydrate intake imitates starvation and forces the body to draw energy from ketone bodies that form when fat is metabolized instead of drawing its energy from sugar. This state is called ketosis and it changes several biochemical processes in the brain in a way that inhibits epileptic activity. On this basis there are several diets that are often recommended to children under 12 years old, but are also effective in adults.

Ketogenic diet

In Europe the ketogenic diet is the diet that is most commonly recommended by doctors for patients with epilepsy. In this diet the ratio of fat to carbohydrates and proteins is 4:1. That means that the fat content of the consumed food must be around 80%, the protein content must be around 15%, and the carbohydrate content must be around 5%. For comparison the average western diet consists of a carbohydrate content of over 50%. After one year on the ketogenic diet the success rate (seizure reduction over 50%) is between 30 and 50% and the dropout rate is around 45%. Although the ketogenic diet can be very effective some families report that it's not compatible with daily life on the long run because it's too restrictive as bread pasta and sweets are forbidden in the ketogenic diet. In puberty with increasing autonomy it can be difficult for adolescents to follow the diet strictly. For this reason a fat ratio of 3: 1 instead of 4: 1 can be recommended to make meals more palatable. Side effects of the ketogenic diet can be constipation, tiredness and after a long term diet, in one out of 20 patients, kidney stones.

MCT-Ketogenic diet

In the 1960s it was discovered that when medium-chain triglycerides (MCT) fats are metabolized in the body more ketone bodies are produced then from metabolizing any other fat. Based on this mechanism the MCT ketogenic diet a modification of the ketogenic diet was developed and it has nearly replaced the classic ketogenic diet in the USA. In the MCT ketogenic diet MCT oil is added to ketogenic meals, which allows the carbohydrate content to be increased to around 15 to 20%. This way some patients find the meals more enjoyable. The success rate of the MCT ketogenic diet does not differ from the classic ketogenic diet however not all children can tolerate the necessary large amounts of MCT oil which is also very expensive.

Modified Atkins

A modified Atkins diet describes the long term practice of the first phase of the popular Atkins diet the so-called induction phase to reduce seizures through ketosis. In this diet the fat content of the nutrition is slightly lower than in the ketogenic diet at around 60%, the protein content is around 30% and the carbohydrate content is around 10% rendering the diet less restrictive and more compatible with the daily life compared to the ketogenic diet.  Several studies show that the modified Atkins diet produces a similar or slightly lower seizure reduction to the ketogenic diet. Some physicians, especially in the US, recommend the modified Atkins diet because they assume that patients will adhere to it on the long-term because it is more compatible with daily life and the meals are more enjoyable. It has also been concluded in another study that the diet is well tolerated and effective in hard to treat childhood epilepsy.

Other
Deep brain stimulation  of the anterior nuclei of the thalamus is approved for DRE in some countries in Europe, but has been and continues to only be used in a very few patients. After 5 years of DBS a seizure reduction of 69% and a 50%-responder rate of 68% was reported in a randomized-double blinded trial. The rate of serious device related events was 34% in this study.

Responsive neurostimulation (RNS) is approved for DRE in the US and involves stimulation directly to 1 or 2 seizure foci when abnormal electrocorticographic activity is detected by the devices software. After 2 years of RNS a seizure reduction of 53% was reported in a randomized-double blinded trial as well as a rate of serious device related events of 2.5%.

Transcutaneous vagus nerve stimulation (tVNS) is approved for DRE in some European countries and involves externally stimulating the auricular branch of the vagus nerve in the ear. tVNS failed to demonstrate efficacy in a first randomized-double blinded trial: responder rates did not differ between active and control groups potentially indicating a placebo effect behind the 34% seizure reduction seen in the patients who completed the full follow-up period.

References

Epilepsy
Drug resistance